War and Pieces is a 1964 Looney Tunes cartoon.

War and Pieces may also refer to:

 "War and Pieces", a 1970 animated short in the Roland and Rattfink series
 "War and Pieces", an episode of the TV series Robotboy
 War and Pieces, a story arc, and collected edition, in the comic-book series Fables
 War and Pieces, an opera by Kraig Grady
 "War and Pieces", an essay by Nicholson Baker
 War and Pieces: John Howard's Last Election, a book by Mungo Wentworth MacCallum

See also
 In War and Pieces, an album by Sodom